Benin competed at the 2019 African Games held from 19 to 31 August 2019 in Rabat, Morocco. In total, athletes representing the country won two bronze medals and the country finished in 38th place in the medal table, shared with Guinea and Togo.

Medal summary

Medal table 

|  style="text-align:left; width:78%; vertical-align:top;"|

|  style="text-align:left; width:22%; vertical-align:top;"|

Archery 

Zinsou Kpetchehoue Merveille Santi competed in archery in the women's individual recurve event. She finished in 17th place.

Athletics 

Souliath Saka, Noelie Yarigo, Odile Ahouanwanou and Romeo N'tia competed in athletics.

Romeo N'tia won the bronze medal in the men's long jump event.

Saka competed in the women's 200 metres and women's 400 metres events. In the 200 metres event she advanced to compete in the semifinals. In the 400 metres event she did not qualify to compete in the semifinals.

Ahouanwanou competed in the women's 100 metres hurdles, women's high jump and women's shot put events. In the 100 metres hurdles event she did not advance to compete in the final.

Yarigo competed in the women's 800 metres event and she finished in 7th place.

Badminton 

Benin competed in badminton with two players. Roman Nouman Aremou Bastien Razaki competed in the men's singles event and Yenoukounme Pascaline L. Vitou competed in the women's singles event.

Cycling 

Six cyclists representing Benin in road cycling events. They competed in the men's road race, men's individual time trial and men's team time trial.

Judo 

Celtus Williams Abiola Dossou-Yovo competed in the Men's -90 kg event.

Karate 

Oceanne Mylene Ganiero competed in karate. She won the bronze medal in the women's -55 kg event.

Rowing 

Privel Meril Hinkati competed in rowing. He competed in the men's single sculls 500 metres event.

Swimming 

Nafissath Radji competed in swimming. She competed in the women's 50 metre backstroke and 50 metre freestyle events.

Taekwondo 

One athlete competed in Taekwondo.

Tennis 

Alexis Klégou and Sylvestre Monnou competed in tennis. They competed in the men's singles and men's doubles events. They did not win a medal.

References 

Nations at the 2019 African Games
2019
African Games